Campomanesia neriiflora is a species of plant in the family Myrtaceae. It is endemic to Brazil.  It is threatened by habitat loss.

References

neriifolia
Endemic flora of Brazil
Flora of Paraná (state)
Flora of São Paulo (state)
Vulnerable flora of South America
Taxonomy articles created by Polbot